Sandy Pond is an  pond in Wareham, Massachusetts. The pond is located east of Spectacle Pond and Mill Pond, and south of Glen Charlie Pond.

External links
Environmental Protection Agency

Wareham, Massachusetts
Ponds of Plymouth County, Massachusetts
Ponds of Massachusetts